The Gods of Pegāna is the first book by Anglo-Irish fantasy writer Lord Dunsany, published on a commission basis in 1905. The book was reviewed favourably but as an unusual piece. One of the more influential reviews was by Edward Thomas in the London Daily Chronicle.

Contents
The book is a series of short stories linked by Dunsany's invented pantheon of deities who dwell in Pegāna. It was followed by a further collection, Time and the Gods, and by some stories in The Sword of Welleran and Other Stories and possibly in Tales of Three Hemispheres. 

The book contains a range of illustrations by Sidney Sime, the originals of all of which can be seen at Dunsany Castle.

In 1919 Dunsany told an American interviewer, "In The Gods of Pegāna I tried to account for the ocean and the moon. I don't know whether anyone else has ever tried that before."

Aside from its various stand-alone editions, the complete text of the collection is included in the Ballantine Adult Fantasy collection Beyond the Fields We Know (1972), in The Complete Pegāna (1998), and in the Gollancz Fantasy Masterworks omnibus Time and the Gods (2000).

Stories
"Preface"
"The Gods of Pegāna"
"Of Skarl the Drummer"
"Of the Making of the Worlds"
"Of the Game of the Gods"
"The Chaunt of the Gods"
"The Sayings of Kib"
"Concerning Sish"
"The Sayings of Slid"
"The Deeds of Mung"
"The Chaunt of the Priests"
"The Sayings of Limpang-Tung"
"Of Yoharneth-Lahai"
"Of Roon, the God of Going"
"The Revolt of the Home Gods"
"Of Dorozhand"
"The Eye in the Waste"
"Of the Thing That Is Neither God Nor Beast"
"Yonath the Prophet"
"Yug the Prophet"
"Alhireth-Hotep the Prophet"
"Kabok the Prophet"
"Of the Calamity That Befel Yūn-Ilāra by the Sea, and of the Building of the Tower of the Ending of Days"
"Of How the Gods Whelmed Sidith"
"Of How Imbaun Became High Prophet in Aradec of All the Gods Save One"
"Of How Imbaun Met Zodrak"
"Pegāna"
"The Sayings of Imbaun"
"Of How Imbaun Spake of Death to the King"
"Of Ood"
"The River"
"The Bird of Doom and the End"

Reception
The New York Times critic John Corbin described Dunsany's debut collection as "an attempt to create an Olympus of his own and people it with an assemblage of deities, each with a personality and a power over human life acutely conceived and visualized ... To me, [the collection] is autobiography, and all the more self-revealing because it is profoundly unconscious. As an achievement of the imagination", Corbin concluded, "this bible of the gods of Pegana is simply amazing".

Gahan Wilson praised The Gods of Pegāna as "a wonderfully sustained exercise in totally ironic fantasy which may never be beaten. Speaking in a highly original mix of King James Bible English, Yeatsian syntax, and Scheherazadian imagery, [Dunsany] introduces us to a wonderfully sinister Valhalla populated with mad, spectacularly cruel and wonderfully silly gods ... whose only genuine amusement appears to derive from the inventive damage they inflict upon their misbegotten worshippers". E. F. Bleiler lauded the collection as "a convincing, marvelous creation of an alien cosmology".

S. T. Joshi, noting that Dunsany was reading Nietzsche at the time he was writing The Gods of Pegāna, declared it "an instantiation of the quintessential act of fantasy: the creation of a new world. Dunsany has simply carried the procedure one step further than any of his conceivable predecessors – William Beckford (Vathek), William Morris with his medieval fantasies – by inventing an entire cosmogony ... Dunsany embodies his new realm with his own philosophical predilections, and these predilections – although expressed in the most gorgeously evocative of prose-poetry – are of a very modern, even radical sort".

The pantheon

MĀNA-YOOD-SUSHĀЇ

The chief of the gods of Pegāna is MĀNA-YOOD-SUSHĀЇ, who created the other gods and then fell asleep; when he wakes, he "will make again new gods and other worlds, and will destroy the gods whom he hath made." Men may pray to "all the gods but one"; only the gods themselves may pray to MĀNA-YOOD-SUSHĀЇ.

Skarl the Drummer
After MĀNA-YOOD-SUSHĀЇ "made the gods and Skarl", Skarl made a drum and beat on it in order to lull his creator to sleep; he keeps drumming eternally, for "if he cease for an instant then MĀNA-YOOD-SUSHĀЇ will start awake, and there will be worlds nor gods no more". Dunsany writes that:

The small gods
Besides MĀNA-YOOD-SUSHĀЇ, there are numerous other gods in Pegāna's pantheon, known as the small gods:

 Kib, the Sender of Life in all the Worlds. The god of beasts and men.
 Sish, the Destroyer of Hours. The god of time.
 Mung, Lord of all Deaths between Pegāna and the Rim. The god of death.
 Slid, whose Soul is by the Sea. The god of waters.
 Limpang-Tung, the God of Mirth and of Melodious Minstrels.
 Yoharneth-Lahai, the God of Little Dreams and Fancies.
 Roon, the God of Going and the Thousand Home Gods.
 Dorozhand, whose Eyes Regard the End. The god of destiny.
 Hoodrazai, the Eye in the Waste. The mirthless god who knows the secret of MĀNA-YOOD-SUSHĀЇ.
 Sirami, the Lord of All Forgetting
Mosahn, the Bird of Doom
 Grimbol, Zeebol and Trehagobol, the three goddesses of the tallest mountains, mothers of the three (once) rebellious river gods.

The thousand home gods
According to Roon, the God of Going, "There are a thousand home gods, the little gods that sit before the hearth and mind the fire – there is one Roon." These home gods include:

 Pitsu, who strokes the cat
 Hobith, who calms the dog
 Habaniah, the lord of glowing embers
 little Zumbiboo, the lord of dust 
 old Gribaun, who sits in the heart of the fire to turn the wood to ash 
 Kilooloogung, the lord of arising smoke
 Jabim, the Lord of broken things
 Triboogie, the Lord of Dusk
 Hish, the Lord of Silence
 Wohoon, the Lord of Noises in the Night
 Eimes, Zanes, and Segastrion, the (once) rebellious lords of the three rivers of the plain
 Umbool, the Lord of the Drought
 Araxes, Zadres, and Hyraglion, stars in the south
 Ingazi, Yo, and Mindo, stars to the north

Trogool, neither god nor beast
Trogool is the mysterious thing set at the very south pole of the cosmos, whose duty is to turn over the pages of a great book, in which history writes itself every day until the end of the world. The fully written pages are "black", meaning the night, and when each one is turned, then the white page symbolizes a new day. Trogool never answers prayer, and the pages that have been turned shall never be turned back, neither by him nor by anyone else.

"Trogool is the Thing that men in many countries have called by many names, It is the Thing that sits behind the gods, whose book is the Scheme of Things."

References

Sources

External links

 
 
 

1905 short story collections
Fantasy short story collections
Short story collections by Edward Plunkett, 18th Baron of Dunsany
High fantasy novels
Lists of fictional deities